The 2000 West Bromwich West by-election was a by-election held on 23 November 2000 for the British House of Commons constituency of West Bromwich West.

The constituency's Member of Parliament (MP) was the Rt. Hon. Betty Boothroyd, the Speaker.  She resigned from the House of Commons as an MP and as Speaker on 23 October 2000, triggering a writ to move the by-election.

In 1997 the major parties had observed a recent tradition by not opposing the Speaker seeking re-election. On its return to partisan politics the seat reverted to Labour, in a similar result to that seen in 1992.

Results

General election result, 1997

References

External links
Campaign literature from the by-election

By-elections to the Parliament of the United Kingdom in West Midlands (county) constituencies
West Bromwich West
West Bromwich West
West Bromwich West
Politics of Sandwell
2000s in the West Midlands (county)